Gunnison is a town in Bolivar County, Mississippi, United States. Per the 2020 census, the population was 295.

The mayor is Frances L. Ward.

Geography

Demographics

2020 census

Note: the US Census treats Hispanic/Latino as an ethnic category. This table excludes Latinos from the racial categories and assigns them to a separate category. Hispanics/Latinos can be of any race.

2000 Census
As of the census of 2000, there were 633 people, 202 households, and 146 families residing in the town. The population density was 651.1 people per square mile (252.0/km2). There were 217 housing units at an average density of 223.2 per square mile (86.4/km2). The racial makeup of the town was 12.64% White, 86.73% African American, 0.16% Native American, and 0.47% from two or more races.

There were 202 households, out of which 40.6% had children under the age of 18 living with them, 25.7% were married couples living together, 41.6% had a female householder with no husband present, and 27.7% were non-families. 26.7% of all households were made up of individuals, and 9.4% had someone living alone who was 65 years of age or older. The average household size was 3.13 and the average family size was 3.79.

In the town, the population was spread out, with 37.3% under the age of 18, 11.4% from 18 to 24, 22.1% from 25 to 44, 16.6% from 45 to 64, and 12.6% who were 65 years of age or older. The median age was 26 years. For every 100 females, there were 77.3 males. For every 100 females age 18 and over, there were 66.8 males.

The median income for a household in the town was $19,432, and the median income for a family was $21,875. Males had a median income of $27,679 versus $15,500 for females. The per capita income for the town was $8,395. About 39.3% of families and 47.9% of the population were below the poverty line, including 60.4% of those under age 18 and 34.2% of those age 65 or over.

Education
Gunnison is served by the West Bolivar Consolidated School District (formerly the West Bolivar School District), which operates West Bolivar High School.

Notable people
Cousins Tim Barnett and Fred Barnett both played in the NFL.

References

Towns in Bolivar County, Mississippi
Towns in Mississippi